D 90, also known as Al Satwa Road, Al Mussallah Road or Mankhool Road is a route in Dubai, United Arab Emirates.  The road begins in the old Al Bastakiya area of Bur Dubai and runs roughly parallel to D 92 and D 94. The road is referred to as Al Mankhool Road when passing through the locality of Al Mankhool.  The road passes through the locality of Al Satwa and ends in the locality of Al Safa.

Important landmarks along D 90 include Al Bastakiya, Al Souk Al Kabir, Jumbo Electronics, Al Khaleej Centre and  Majestic Hotel. Ramada hotel closed down in 2017. Metro stop: Green line, Al fahidi.

References

Roads in the United Arab Emirates
Transport in Dubai